Limpach may refer to several places:

Limpach, Luxembourg, in the commune of Reckange-sur-Mess
Limpach (Bodensee), in the district of Bodensee, Baden-Württemberg
Limpach, Switzerland, in the Canton of Bern
Limpach (river) that flows down to the Emme river.